An electoral district in Canada is a geographical constituency upon which Canada's representative democracy is based. It is officially known in Canadian French as a circonscription but frequently called a comté (county). In Canadian English it is also colloquially and more commonly known as a riding or constituency.

Each federal electoral district returns one Member of Parliament (MP) to the House of Commons of Canada; each provincial or territorial electoral district returns one representative—called, depending on the province or territory, Member of the Legislative Assembly (MLA), Member of the National Assembly (MNA), Member of Provincial Parliament (MPP) or Member of the House of Assembly (MHA)—to the provincial or territorial legislature.

Since 2015, there have been 338 federal electoral districts in Canada. In provincial and territorial legislatures, the provinces and territories each set their own number of electoral districts independently of their federal representation. The province of Ontario currently defines most, but not all, of its provincial electoral districts to align with federal boundaries; no other province does so, and even Ontario maintains a few variances from federal boundaries.

Elections Canada is the independent body set up by Parliament to oversee Canadian federal elections, while each province and territory has its own separate elections agency to oversee the provincial and territorial elections.

Terminology
Originally, most electoral districts were equivalent to the counties used for local government, hence the French unofficial term comté. However, it became common, especially in Ontario, to divide counties with sufficient population into multiple electoral divisions. The Constitution Act, 1867, which created the electoral map for Ontario for the first federal and provincial general elections, used the term "ridings" to describe districts which were sub-divisions of counties. The word "riding", from Old English *þriðing "one-third" (compare farthing, literally "one-fourth"), is an English term denoting a sub-division of a county.

In some of Canada's earliest censuses, in fact, some citizens in the Ontario ridings of Bothwell, Cardwell, Monck and Niagara listed their electoral district as their "county" of residence instead of their actual county.

Although the term "riding" is no longer used officially to indicate an electoral district, it has passed into common usage. Soon after Confederation, the urban population grew—and more importantly, most city dwellers gained the franchise after property ownership was no longer required to gain the vote. Rural constituencies therefore became geographically larger through the 20th century and generally encompassed one or more counties each, and the word "riding" became used to refer to any electoral division.

A political party's local organization is generally known as a riding association; the legal term is electoral district association or EDA.

Historical multi-member districts 
While electoral districts at both the federal and provincial levels are now exclusively single-member districts, multiple-member districts have been used in the past. The federal riding of Ottawa elected two members from 1872 to 1933. The federal riding of Halifax elected two members from the 1800s to 1966.  The federal riding of Victoria elected two members from 1872 to 1903. As well, eight other federal ridings elected multiple (two) members at different times.

As well, every province plus the territories of Yukon and Northwest Territories at one time or another used multi-seat districts. The use of multi-member districts usually led to the use of plurality block voting but occasionally other forms of voting were used in the multi-seat districts.  

From 1920 to 1949 Winnipeg used single transferable vote (STV) to elect 10 MLAs in a single city-wide district. And then the city was made into three four-member districts, with again the seats filled through STV. St. Boniface elected two MLAs in 1949 and 1953 through STV.

Alberta had three provincial districts that at various times returned two, five, six or seven members: see Calgary, Edmonton and Medicine Hat. Prior to 1924 these seats were filled through plurality block voting but from 1924 to 1956 the seats were filled through single transferable voting (STV).

Saskatchewan used multi-member provincial districts in Saskatoon, Regina and Moose Jaw, from 1920 to 1967. These seats were filled through multiple non-transferable vote.

British Columbia provincially had a mix of multiple-member districts and single-member districts at the provincial level from 1871 to the 1991 election. Members were elected through plurality (first past the post or plurality block voting). The only exception were the 1952 and 1953 elections, when instant-runoff voting was used. In the case of multi-member districts, separate contests were used to elect separate MLAs in the same district.

Prince Edward Island had dual-member districts at the provincial level from Confederation to the 1996 election.

In the case of New Brunswick, between 1935 and 1974, some ridings were multi member districts, electing more than one MLA in a district at each election.

In the case of Ontario, Toronto in 1886 and 1890 was a multi-member provincial district. Limited voting was used to ensure mixed representation and voter satisfaction. From 1908 to 1914, the four Toronto districts elected two MLAs each.

With just a few exceptions, voters in multiple-member districts were able to cast as many votes as there were seats in the district (block voting). Usually, under block voting, one single party took all the seats in the district. STV was used in Alberta and Manitoba multi-member districts from 1920s to 1950s. STV almost always produced mixed representation with no one-party sweep. 

As mentioned, limited voting was used in Toronto when it was a multi-member district.

IRV was used in all BC districts including the multi-member districts, in 1952 and 1953. This voting system ensured that the winner had the support of a majority of votes in each contest but did nothing to create proportionality.

Naming conventions
Electoral district names are usually geographic in nature, and chosen to represent the community or region within the electoral district boundaries.  Some electoral districts in Quebec are named for historical figures rather than geography, e.g., Louis-Hébert, Honoré-Mercier. Similarly in Alberta, provincial districts mix geographic names with those of historical personages (e.g., Edmonton-Decore after Laurence Decore, Calgary-Lougheed after Peter Lougheed and James Alexander Lougheed). This practice is no longer employed in the other provinces and territories.

Boundary adjustment for federal electoral districts
Electoral district boundaries are adjusted to reflect population changes after each decennial census. Depending on the significance of a boundary change, an electoral district's name may change as well. Any adjustment of electoral district boundaries is official as of the date the changes are legislated, but is not put into actual effect until the first subsequent election. Thus, an electoral district may officially cease to exist, but will continue to be represented status quo in the House of Commons until the next election is called. This, for example, gives new riding associations time to organize, and prevents the confusion that would result from changing elected MPs' electoral district assignments in the middle of a Parliament.

On some occasions (e.g., Timiskaming—French River, Toronto—Danforth), a riding's name may be changed without a boundary adjustment. This usually happens when it is determined at a later date that the existing name is not sufficiently representative of the district's geographic boundaries. This is the only circumstance in which a sitting MP's riding name may change between elections.

The number of electoral districts for first federal election in 1867 were set by the Constitution Act, 1867 on the principle of representation by population. The Act provided Quebec a minimum of 65 seats and seat allotment for the remainder of the country was based by dividing the average population of Quebec's 65 electoral districts to determine the number of seats for other provinces. The Act also specified that distribution and boundary reviews should occur after each 10 year census.  The boundaries for Quebec's seats were based on the 65 seats Canada East had held in the Parliament of the Province of Canada, prior to Confederation, while the boundaries for Ontario's 82 seats were set by the Constitution Act, 1867.

Formula for adjusting federal electoral boundaries
The present formula for adjusting electoral boundaries was adopted in 2022.  It starts by calculating an "electoral quotient", based on the average of the growth rate of the provinces since the time of the last redistribution, the previous redistribution's electoral quotient is then multiplied by this average, and then the population of each individual province is divided by this electoral quotient then rounded up to determine the number of seats to which the province is officially entitled. Additionally, one seat is automatically allocated to each of Canada's three territories.

Finally, a few special rules are applied. Under the "senatorial clause", a province's number of seats in the House of Commons can never be lower than its constitutionally mandated number of senators, regardless of the province's population. Under the "grandfather clause", the province's number of seats can also never fall below the number of seats it had in the 43rd Canadian Parliament (2019-2021). Under the "representation rule", no province that had a higher share of seats than its population share in the last redistribution can have its share of seats drop below its population share.

A province may be allocated extra seats over its base entitlement to ensure that these rules are met. In 2022, for example, Prince Edward Island would have been entitled to only two seats according to the electoral quotient, but through the senatorial clause the province gained two more seats to equal its four senators. Quebec was only entitled to 71 seats by the electoral quotient alone, but through the grandfather clause the province gained seven seats to equal the 78 seats it had in the 43rd Parliament. Saskatchewan and Manitoba also gained seats under the grandfather clause, New Brunswick gained seats under the senatorial clause, and Nova Scotia and Newfoundland and Labrador gained seats under the grandfather and senate clauses.

In practice, the process results in most provinces maintaining the same number of seats from one redistribution to the next, due to the senatorial and grandfather clauses—prior to the 2015 election, only Ontario, Alberta and British Columbia, traditionally the country's three fastest-growing provinces, had ever gained seats in a redistribution. All other provinces still held the same number of seats that they held in 1985, and were thus already protected from losing even one seat by the other clauses. The 2012 redistribution, which added three new seats in Quebec under the newly added representation rule, was the first and so far only time since 1985 that any of the other seven provinces had ever gained new seats.

Some sources incorrectly state that a special provision guaranteeing a certain number of seats to Quebec is also applied. While such a provision was proposed in the failed Charlottetown Accord, no such rule currently exists—Quebec's seat allotment in the House of Commons is in fact governed by the same adjustment clauses as all other provinces, and not by any provisions unique to Quebec alone.  However, such provisions have existed at various times in the past.  From 1867 to 1946 Quebec was allocated 65 seats, with the other provinces allocated seats based on their size relative to Quebec.  The "amalgam formula" of 1976 set the number of Quebec seats to 75, which was to be increased by 4 after each decennial census. Other "large" provinces (over 2.5 million) would be assigned seats based on their relative population to Quebec. The amalgam formula was applied only once, based on the 1971 census.  After the 1981 census it was realized that adding an additional four seats to Quebec every ten years would rapidly inflate the size of the House of Commons, so that formula was abandoned in favour of the 1985 Representation Act.

In 2008 the government of Prime Minister Stephen Harper proposed an amendment to the process which would have given Alberta, British Columbia and Ontario, the three provinces whose electoral districts have an average size larger than those in Quebec, a total of 32 additional seats by applying Quebec's average of 105,000. The measure initially included only British Columbia and Alberta; Harper later proposed an alternative plan which included Ontario. However, opposition then emerged in Quebec, where politicians expressed concern about the province losing clout in Ottawa if its proportion of seats in the House of Commons were reduced; finally, three new seats were allotted to Quebec as well. The measure did not pass before the 2011 election was called, but was put forward again after the election. It was passed on December 16, 2011 as the Fair Representation Act (Bill C-20), and resulted in the 2012 redistribution process.

On March 24, 2022, the Liberal Trudeau government tabled legislation to prevent Quebec (or any other province) from losing any seats relative to the number of seats it was apportioned in 2012 Canadian federal electoral redistribution. Bill C-14 amended Rule 2 of subsection 51(1) of the Constitution Act, 1867, commonly known as the "Grandfather Clause". The Bill passed the House of Commons on June 15, 2022, passed the Senate on June 21, 2022, and received royal assent on June 23, 2022. The Chief Electoral Officer announced the new allocation of seats on July 8, 2022, which would result in an increase to 343 seats. The act was introduced after a Bloc Québécois' motion calling for government action to protect the number of Quebec's seat after redistribution.

Boundary review of federal electoral districts

When the province's final seat allotment is determined, an independent election boundaries commission in each province reviews the existing boundaries and proposes adjustments. Public input is then sought, which may then lead to changes in the final boundary proposal. For instance, the proposed boundaries may not accurately reflect a community's historical, political or economic relationship with its surrounding region; the community would thus advise the boundary commission that it wished to be included in a different electoral district.

For example, in the 2003 boundary adjustment, the boundary commission in Ontario originally proposed dividing the city of Greater Sudbury into three districts. The urban core would have remained largely unchanged as Sudbury, while communities west of the central city would have been merged with Algoma—Manitoulin to form the new riding of Greater Sudbury—Manitoulin, and those east and north of the central city would have been merged with Timiskaming to create the riding of Timiskaming—Greater Sudbury.

Due to the region's economic and transportation patterns, however, "Timiskaming—Greater Sudbury" was particularly opposed by its potential residents — voters in Sudbury were concerned about the weakening of their representation if the city were divided into one city-based riding and two large rural ones rather than two city-based ridings, while the Timiskaming District is much more strongly aligned with and connected to North Bay, to which it has a direct highway link, than to Sudbury. In a deputation to the boundary commission, Sudbury's deputy mayor Ron Dupuis stated that "An electoral district must be more than a mere conglomeration of arbitrary and random groups of individuals. Districts should, as much as possible, be cohesive units with common interests related to representation. This makes a representative's job of articulating the interests of his or her constituency much easier." Instead, in the final report that was passed by the House of Commons, the Sudbury area's existing ridings of Sudbury and Nickel Belt were retained with only minor boundary adjustments, while the Timiskaming riding was merged with Nipissing. Despite the opposition that arose to the 2003 process, however, virtually the same tripartite division of the city was proposed in the boundary adjustment of 2012, although due to concerns around balancing the Northern Ontario region's population against its geographic size, the commission announced in 2013 that it would retain the existing electoral districts again.

Similarly, opposition arose in Toronto during the 2012 redistribution process, especially to a proposal which would have divided the Church and Wellesley neighbourhood, the city's primary gay village, between the existing riding of Toronto Centre and a new riding of Mount Pleasant along the length of Wellesley Street. In the final report, the northern boundary of Toronto Centre was shifted north to Charles Street.

Once the final report is produced, it is then submitted to Parliament, MPs may offer objections to the boundaries, but the boundary commissions are not compelled to make any changes as a result of the objections.

At Canadian Confederation, the boundaries were defined by the Constitution Act, 1867. Boundaries for one or more electoral districts were updated in 1872, 1882, 1892, 1903, 1914, 1924, 1933, and 1947. Subsequent changes are known as Representation Order, and occurred in 1952, 1966, 1976, 1987, 1996, 2003 and 2012. Such changes come into force "on the first dissolution of Parliament that occurs at least seven months after the day on which that proclamation was issued".

Boundary adjustment for provincial and territorial electoral districts
The boundary adjustment processes for electoral districts in provincial or territorial legislative assemblies follow provincial or territorial, rather than federal, law; they are overseen by each province's or territory's own election agency rather than by Elections Canada, and legislated by the provincial legislature rather than the federal parliament. Each province is free to decide its own number of legislative assembly seats, and is not required to comply with the federal quotas that govern its number of parliamentary districts.

Ontario
Prior to 1999, provincial electoral districts were defined independently of federal districts; at the time of the 1995 Ontario general election, the province had 103 seats in the Canadian House of Commons but 130 in its provincial legislature. For the 1999 Ontario general election, however, the government of Mike Harris passed legislation which mandated that seats in the provincial legislature would follow federal electoral district boundaries, both reducing the size of the legislature and eliminating the cost of the province conducting its own boundary adjustment process. After each federal boundary adjustment, seats in the legislative assembly would henceforth be automatically realigned to match the federal boundaries at the first subsequent provincial election.

Although most electoral districts in the province still conform to federal boundaries, later amendments to the 1999 legislation have reauthorized the introduction of some differences from the federal map. In the Southern Ontario region, provincial districts remain in precise alignment with the federal ones; in the Northern Ontario region, however, because the region's slower growth would result in the gradual loss of seats compared to the more rapidly growing south, most districts still retain the same boundaries as the federal districts that were in place as of 2003, and are not readjusted to correspond to current federal boundaries. For the 2018 Ontario general election, further, two new uniquely provincial districts were added to increase representation for the far north of the province. As a result, the province currently has 121 seats in the House of Commons, but 124 seats in the provincial legislature.

Prince Edward Island
When Prince Edward Island joined Confederation in 1873, it set a fixed formula in which each of the province's three counties was divided into five electoral districts per county, each of which elected two representatives to the provincial legislature. These districts were never adjusted for demographic changes, except in 1966 when the district for the capital city of Charlottetown was divided into two. After 1966, however, the electoral district boundaries again remained unchanged until 1996, when the province adopted new single-member districts. Under the new model, electoral districts are now adjusted every ten years, although most adjustments are geographically modest and the district's name is sometimes, but not always, the only substantive change that actually occurs.

Political issues 
Because electoral district boundaries are proposed by an arms-length body, rather than directly by political parties themselves, gerrymandering is not generally seen as an issue in Canada. However, in 2006 the provincial government of Prince Edward Island was accused of gerrymandering after it rejected the independent boundary commission's report and instead proposed a new map that would have seen the cities of Charlottetown and Summerside each gain one additional seat, with two fewer seats allocated to rural areas of the province. The alternate map gave every incumbent member of the governing party a "safe" seat to run in, while the original report would have forced some of the party's MLAs to compete against each other in nomination contests.

The unequal size of electoral districts across Canada has sometimes given rise to discussion of whether all Canadians enjoy equal democratic representation by population. For example, the four federal electoral districts in Prince Edward Island have an average size of just 33,963 voters each, while federal electoral districts in Ontario, Alberta and British Columbia have an average size of over 125,000 voters each—only slightly smaller, in fact, than the entire population of Prince Edward Island.

Conversely, pure representation by population creates distinct disadvantages for some Canadians, giving rise to frequent debate about how to balance the population size of electoral districts against their geographic size. Thus, while Canadians who reside in major urban centres typically live within walking distance of their federal or provincial representatives' constituency offices, a rural resident may not even be able to call their federal or provincial representative's constituency offices without incurring long-distance calling charges.

Further, a rural politician who represents dozens of geographically dispersed small towns must normally incur much greater travel expenses, being forced to drive for several hours, or even to travel by air, in order to visit parts of their own district—and may even need to maintain more than one constituency office in order to properly represent all of their constituents. In Ontario, for example, the highest annual expense budgets among members of the Legislative Assembly of Ontario are consistently filed by the representatives for Mushkegowuk—James Bay and Kiiwetinoong, the province's two largest and northernmost electoral districts; both must spend far more on travel to and from Toronto, travel within their own ridings and additional support staff in multiple communities within their ridings than any other legislator in the province.

See also
 Electoral district
 Constituency
 List of Canadian federal electoral districts
 Past Canadian electoral districts
 Canadian provincial electoral districts
 Population of Canadian federal ridings
 Riding (country subdivision)

References

Works cited

Further reading 
 

Constitution of Canada